George Stephen John Faber (born 30 November 1959 in Kensington, London) is a British television producer. He was the founder and joint managing director of Company Pictures, one of the UK's largest independent drama production companies, twice winner of Best Independent Production Company at the Broadcast Awards and also winner of Best European Production Company at the Monte Carlo TV Festival. In 2014 he founded The Forge which produced National Treasure starring Robbie Coltrane, Julie Walters and Andrea Riseborough.

TV output 
Collateral (BBC/Netflix)
National Treasure (Channel 4)
London Irish (Channel 4)
The White Queen (BBC)
The Village (BBC)
Secret State (Channel 4)
Beaver Falls (E4)
The Shadow Line (BBC)
The Runaway (Sky 1)
Women in Love (BBC)
The Silence (BBC)
Generation Kill (HBO)
The Devil's Whore (Channel 4)
Einstein and Eddington (BBC)
The Invisibles (BBC)
The Palace (ITV)
Life Is Wild (The CW)
Talk to Me (ITV)
Mansfield Park (ITV)
Shameless (Channel 4) 
Skins (Channel 4)
Inspector George Gently (BBC)
Wild at Heart (ITV)
Wallis & Edward (ITV)
The Ghost Squad (Channel 4)
The Life and Death of Peter Sellers (HBO/BBC) 
The Rotters' Club (BBC)
Elizabeth I (Channel 4/HBO)
Marian, Again (ITV)
Not Only But Always (Channel 4)
Tom Brown's Schooldays (ITV)
Lawless (ITV)
P.O.W. (ITV)
Sparkling Cyanide (ITV)
40 (Channel 4)
Unconditional Love (ITV)
Sons and Lovers (ITV)
Serious & Organised (ITV)
Rose and Maloney (ITV)
White Teeth (Channel 4)
Nicholas Nickleby (ITV)
North Square (Channel 4)
Anna Karenina (Channel 4)
Cor, Blimey! (ITV)
Never Never (Channel 4)
The Lakes (BBC)
The Young Person's Guide to Becoming a Rock Star (Channel 4)

References

External links

1959 births
Living people
People educated at King's College School, London
British television producers
People from Kensington